Pamela Peterson (born June 28, 1955) is an American Republican Party politician from the U.S. state of New York, who represented the 67th district in the Oklahoma House of Representatives from 2004 to 2016. The district is contained in Tulsa County. She served as majority floor leader, the first woman to hold that post.

Biography
Peterson was born in New York City and lived there until she was eighteen years old. Her parents were very involved with politics and Peterson began working on campaigns at the age of twelve. After high school, Peterson moved to Tulsa, OK to attend Oral Roberts University. Shortly after graduation, Peterson married and moved to Minneapolis with her husband. While her husband attended medical school at the University of Minnesota, Peterson worked for a TV station in the Twin Cities area.

Peterson and her family eventually moved back to Tulsa, where she volunteered on Don Nickles' campaign in 1992. When Representative Hopper Smith vacated his seat to serve in Afghanistan in 2003, Peterson ran, winning 68% of the vote against two male opponents.

House of Representatives
Peterson was elected in 2005 and still serves in the Oklahoma House of Representatives. She will reach her term limit in 2016.

Committees
Conference Committee on Criminal Justice & Corrections, Chair
Criminal Justice & Corrections, Chair
Children, Youth & Family Services, Vice Chair
Conference Committee on Children, Youth & Family Services, Vice Chair
Appropriations & Budget
Conference Committee on Public Safety
General Conference Committee on Appropriations & Budget
Joint Committee on Appropriations & Budget
Public Safety

Positions
1992 National Delegate to Republican Convention
Former Tulsa County Republican Chairman
Former 1st Congressional District Vice Chairman for Republican Party
Former Majority Whip (’05-‘06)
Task Force to Stop Sexual Violence Chairman
Oklahoma Commission on Status of Women

References

External links
 Oklahoma State Legislature profile

Women of the Oklahoma Legislature Oral History Project -- OSU Library

Living people
1955 births
Oral Roberts University alumni
Republican Party members of the Oklahoma House of Representatives
Women state legislators in Oklahoma
21st-century American politicians
21st-century American women politicians